Mohamed Kahin Ahmed is a Somaliland politician and former military officer of the Somali National Movement. He is currently serving as the Minister of Interior of Somaliland since December 2017. He has been a prominent member of Kulmiye Party since its foundation, and served as the deputy chairman of the party from July 2010 to December 2017.

See also

 Ministry of Interior (Somaliland)
 Peace, Unity, and Development Party
 List of Somalis

References

1942 births
Government ministers of Somaliland
Living people
Peace, Unity, and Development Party politicians
People from Burao